The 1961 Women's Handball European Champions Cup was the inaugural edition of the premier competition for women's handball clubs. Eight teams from Austria, Czechoslovakia, France, West Germany, Poland, Romania, the Soviet Union and Yugoslavia took part in the competition, which took place from 19 January to 18 March 1961.

Știința Bucharest defeated Spartak Subotica, Zalgiris Kaunas and finally Dynamo Prague in the final's both legs to become the first European champion. It was the first of three titles won by Romanian teams to date.

Quarter-finals

Semifinals

Final

References

Women's EHF Champions League
European Cup Women

IHF